Soothran (Malayalam: സൂത്രൻ) is the titular protagonist of the Indian comic series that appears regularly in the Malayalam children's magazine Balarama. The comics are conceptualized by Luis Fernandes (the editor of Tinkle) and N. M. Mohan, written by Madhavan Namboothiri and illustrated (currently) by Simi Muhamma.

The story revolves around a smart jackal named Soothran who lives in a cave in the jungle. His best friend, Sheru, is a dumb and cowardly tiger. The strips depict the adventures of the two friends, and is noted for its funny twist endings. 

The comic strip, launched in mid-2001 (July), was a huge success. Unlike other comics in Malayalam, it became widely popular among Kerala youth also and soon became a flagship strip of the magazine. More than 500 weekly strips of Soothran have been published so far, each one about 4 or 5 pages in length. 

"Soothran" was created by Luis Fernandes, the editor of the Tinkle magazine, and N. M. Mohan for Balarama in 2001. Simi Muhamma, an artist from Muhamma in Alleppey, currently draws the comics and Madhavan Namboothiri prepares the script.

Trivia
 Soothran comics have also been published as special summer month collections, starting in 2003.
 Akku and Ikku is a spin-off story from the Soothran universe and was appeared in "Balarama" magazine.
 Soothran and Sheru appear in a series of crossover comics known as All the Best.

References

External links
Soothran online at the Malayala Manorama website

Indian comics
Malayalam comics
Comics characters introduced in 2001